Konidela Ram Charan Teja (born 27 March 1985) is an Indian actor, producer, and entrepreneur who primarily works in Telugu films. One of the highest-paid actors in Indian cinema, he is the recipient of three Filmfare Awards and two Nandi Awards. Since 2013, he has featured in Forbes Indias Celebrity 100 list.

Charan made his acting debut with the action film Chirutha (2007), a box office hit, winning the Filmfare Award for Best Male Debut – South. He rose to prominence starring in S. S. Rajamouli's fantasy action film Magadheera (2009), the highest-grossing Telugu film of all time at the time of its release, winning the Filmfare Award for Best Actor – Telugu. His notable works include Racha (2012), Naayak (2013), Yevadu (2014), Govindudu Andarivadele (2014), and Dhruva (2016). For RRR, he received a nomination at the Critics' Choice Super Awards for Best Actor in an Action Movie.

In 2016, Charan launched his own production house Konidela Production Company, which has notably backed Khaidi No. 150 (2017) and Sye Raa Narasimha Reddy (2019). Beyond his film career, he owns the polo team Hyderabad Polo and Riding Club was a co-owner of the regional airline service TruJet.

Early life and family

Ram Charan was born in Madras (now Chennai) to Telugu film actor Chiranjeevi and his wife Surekha on 27 March 1985. He has two sisters: Sushmitha and Sreeja. 

Ram Charan was educated at Padma Seshadri Bala Bhavan, Chennai, Lawrence School, Lovedale, The Hyderabad Public School, Begumpet, and then at the St. Mary's College, Hyderabad. He also attended Kishore Namit Kapoor's acting school in Mumbai, Maharashtra.

Acting career

2007–2009: Debut and breakthrough 
In 2007, Charan made his film debut as the leading actor in Chirutha, an action film directed by Puri Jagannadh which completed 50 days in 178 direct movie theaters and 15 other shifted movie theaters. He played the role of Charan, an ex-convict seeking to kill his father's murderer. Rediff.com praised his performance, stating: "Ram Charan is quite promising. Dance and action appear to be forte. He is rather graceful in the dance numbers. He also stays clear of any oblique reference to his star father by way of dialogue or adopting any particular mannerism or style." His performance in the film earned him the Filmfare Award for Best Male Debut – South and the Nandi Special Jury Award.

After the release of his second film, the fantasy film Magadheera (2009), Charan established himself as one of the leading contemporary actors in Tollywood. The film, in which he played dual roles, was directed by S. S. Rajamouli, and Charan's performance was critically acclaimed. The Times of India stated that "Ram Charan returns as a valiant soldier and breathes life into the larger-than-life role with ease. He showcases his horse-riding and dancing skills to perfection." IndiaGlitz commented: "Charan has come up with a mature performance and he has carried the film very well. Both his characters were done justice, and he reminded of his father at many places." Magadheera grossed over ₹150 crores worldwide and held the record of being the highest-grossing Telugu film until 2013 before it was surpassed by Attarintiki Daredi. The film received six Filmfare Awards including two awards – Filmfare Award for Best Actor – Telugu and the Nandi Special Jury Award for Charan.

2010–2013: Career fluctuations 
Charan starred in Bommarillu Bhaskar's urban romance Orange in 2010 as Ram, a NRI living in Australia. Although the film didn't perform well at the box office, critics praised the storyline and performance by Charan. Jeevi of Idlebrain felt that Charan didn't try to stick to stardom and is not willing to repeat the mistakes performed by other stars. Over the years, it became a cult film and received appreciation from the audience. In her article for Film Companion, Alekhya Devarakonda compared his character to Howard Roark of 1943 novel The Fountainhead. Following a year-long absence from the screen, he next appeared in Racha (2012), directed by Sampath Nandi. He played the role of "Betting Raj", a gambler. The film completed a 100-day run in 38 centres across Andhra Pradesh on 13 July 2012. His performance in the film earned him acting nominations at the Filmfare and SIIMA award ceremonies. Sify stated, "Both, actor Ram Charan and his director Sampath Nandi play a safe game by following the same pattern of earlier mass-masala movies." Radhika Rajamani of Rediff criticized the plot of the film, but praised Charan's performance in action sequences and dance moves. IndiaGlitz wrote: "He shows flashes of Chiru-ness more than he ever did in the past; be it his baritone or demeanor, he is a megastar in effect. Helped by a strong script, he could have been much better." The film was released on 5 April 2012 and was declared a commercial success.

Charan had two films released in 2013. His first release was Naayak, directed by V. V. Vinayak, in which he played a dual role, once again after Magadheera. Writing to The Times of India, Karthik Pasupulate wrote that "Ram Charan did a great job, though there was no variation shown between the two characters." It opened to mixed critical reviews and became a commercial success. The film brought him two nominations – the Filmfare Award for Best Actor – Telugu and the SIIMA Award for Best Actor (Telugu), once again, with a Best Actor award at TSR – TV9 National Film Awards. The same year he made his Hindi cinema debut alongside Priyanka Chopra in the Telugu-Hindi bilingual film Zanjeer, a remake of the 1973 film of the same name. He played the role of ACP Vijay Khanna who swears vengeance on his parents' killer. Charan made his debut as a playback singer with the song "Mumbai Ke Hero", composed by Chirrantan Bhatt, from the album Thoofan, the Telugu version of Zanjeer. Rediff called it as "an unforgivably bad remake." Film critic Rajeev Masand criticized his performance writing that he "comes off as stiff as a wax statue in his Bollywood debut, with barely any emotion, forget brooding anger." Amid huge expectations, the film became a box-office bomb. Following the film's box-office performance and critics reviews, Charan decided not to feature again in a Hindi film.

2014–2015: Continued career 
The following year saw Charan with two releases. Yevadu (2014), directed by Vamshi Paidipally is the third film in which he played the dual role, one who has received a face transplant of the other and becomes the target of underworld gangs because of the mistaken identity. The Central Board of Film Certification gave the film an 'A' certificate because of its violent action sequences. Bangalore Mirror wrote that "For Ram Charan, Yevadu is essential to establish his status after Thoofan tanked at the box office. His character has two shades, and he tries his best to bring variations. He dances like there is no tomorrow and the choreography is a delight to watch." A critic of Sify compared Charan's performance to his earlier films – Nayak and Thoofan and commented that he has done a fairly good job here. Y. Sunita Chowdhary of The Hindu felt that Charan did well in the dance sequences than his acting in the role.

His second release of the same year was the family drama Govindudu Andarivadele. The film features him as a NRI from the United Kingdom. Sangeetha Devi Dundoo commented that he has given his best performance after Magadheera. Similarly Suresh Kaviyarani of the Deccan Chronicle too praised him and cited Charan's performance as "good" and "subtle".

He next played an IB Officer and a stunt performer in the Srinu Vaitla's action comedy film Bruce Lee: The Fighter (2015). Charan hired Priyanka Chopra's trainer Samir Jaura in mid-July 2014 to get into shape for this film by following an intensive training program designed by Jaura, lasting for four-five months along with a strict diet. He also began learning Karate for his role in mid May 2015. For the role, he sported a tattoo of Bruce Lee on his hand.  The film collected more than 12.66 crore, on its opening day, registering the highest opening day collection of Ram Charan's film. Over days the film didn't performed well at the box office and was declared as a box-office bomb, with a budget of 60 crore. Sangeetha Devi Dundoo of The Hindu once again criticized Charan's performance and wrote that "Charan dances like a dream, as always, and shows marked improvement as an actor. But what he needs is a project that will not belittle the huge fan base in the garb of masala."

2016–2018: Rangasthalam and commercial success 
He next appeared in 2016 the action thriller film Dhruva (2016), where he played as an IPS officer. The film follows the story of Dhruva, an IPS officer who wants to arrest Siddharth Abhimanyu (played by Arvind Swami), a wealthy scientist, who uses secret medical and illegal practices for profit. Krishna Vamsi of The Indian Express wrote that "From his physique to his fights, he makes you hark back to Magadheera." The Times of India's Srividya Palaparthi added "Ram Charan looks his fittest best. As an actor, Ram Charan impresses in all the scenes that required high emotion. And as for the scenes where he had to be elevated as the hero, they will not disappoint his fans." He performed his own stunts in the film. He received his fourth nomination for the Filmfare Award for Best Actor – Telugu for his performance in the film. Charan made a cameo appearance in "Ammadu Let's Do Kummudu" song from the film Khaidi No. 150 (2017), alongside his father Chiranjeevi, Devi Sri Prasad, and Kajal Aggarwal. The film marked the comeback of his father into the mainstream cinema after Shankar Dada Zindabad (2007).

In 2018, he appeared in the Sukumar's directed period action-drama Rangasthalam, which earned him  particular praise for his performance as Chitti Babu, a semi-deaf villager, with several critics deeming it to be his career-best performance. The film also emerged as a major commercial success, becoming the highest-grossing Telugu film of the year, with a gross collection of over 216 crores. Set in the 1980s in the Konaseema region of Andhra Pradesh, the film explores various themes including caste-based honour killings, brahminical patriarchy and good versus evil. The film was featured on several year-end best films' charts. Nagarjuna Rao of Gulf News wrote that "There comes a career-best for all actors at some point of time. Rangasthalam could well be Ram Charan's" Subhash K. Jha of The Free Press Journal commented Teja transforms in front of our eyes, adding "It is almost like watching a magic show where the entire appearance of the actor undergoes a sea change as we gawk in open-mouthed amazement." After a long time, Ram Charan won several accolades including his second Filmfare Award for Best Actor – Telugu and the SIIMA Award for Best Actor – Telugu. In her article 5 Best Performances of Ram Charan Teja, S Behara of The Indian Express included Charan's performances in the films Chirutha (2007), Magadheera (2009), Orange (2010), Dhruva (2016) and Rangasthalam (2018). In March 2018, Rajamouli confirmed that Charan would feature as one of the leads alongside N. T. Rama Rao Jr. in his next film.

2019–present: Career expansion 
He next appeared in the action film Vinaya Vidheya Rama (2019), directed by Boyapati Srinu, alongside Kiara Advani and Vivek Oberoi. The film opened to negative reviews, receiving criticism for the improper action scenes and screenplay, consequently didn't perform well at the box office. Writing for The Hindu, Sangeetha Devi stated: "Whatever made Ram Charan sign up for this loud, mind-numbing film after Rangasthalam? ". India Today's Janani K felt that, Charan need to start from scratch due to the film. As a result of the film's failure at the box office, Charan wrote an open apology to his fans. The same year, in March, it was announced that he would portray Alluri Sitarama Raju in S. S. Rajamouli's directorial RRR, co-starring N. T. Rama Rao Jr. The film was released in March 2022 with widespread acclaim from both Indian and other foreign critics. His performance in the film received particular praise. Shubhra Gupta of The Indian Express wrote "The film casts not just one super-star, but two of them – Jr NTR and Ram Charan. The biggest super-star among them all is SS Rajamouli and the audience also saved the loudest 'taalis' (claps) for him". The film has also became the third highest-grossing Indian film and second highest-grossing Telugu film worldwide, with him getting a Critics' Choice Super Best Actor in an Action Movie nomination.

He starred alongside his father Chiranjeevi in Acharya (2022) directed by Koratala Siva. Chiranjeevi confirmed that Charan would be doing the role in June 2020. In February 2021, he signed a film with director S. Shankar, tentatively titled as RC15, under the production of Dil Raju's Sri Venkateswara Creations. The filming is scheduled to complete by the mid of 2023.

Other work

Charan is an equestrian. The Hans India reported that he had learnt horse-riding in his childhood. In September 2011, he started his own polo team Ram Charan Hyderabad Polo Riding Club. He also served on the board of directors of Maa TV. In 2009, he became a spokesperson for Pepsi's advertisement campaigns.

Turbo Megha Airways Private Limited was incorporated in March 2013, with Charan and Vankayalapati Umesh as promoters. In early July 2015, the airline adopted the brand name TruJet. It received its air operator's certificate for regional operations from the Directorate General of Civil Aviation on 7 July 2015. He is also the spokesman and co-owner of the obstacle running series Devil's circuit.

Charan started his own film production company Konidela Production Company in 2016. The first film produced from the studio is his father Chiranjeevi's 150th film Khaidi No. 150 (2017). The film grossed over 164 crore at the box office, on a budget of 50 crore. Following the success of the film, he again collaborated with his father and produced Sye Raa Narasimha Reddy (2019) with a production budget of ₹270–300 crore.

Philanthropy 
He often organizes blood donation camps. On 26 May 2021, Charan launched oxygen banks along with his father Chiranjeevi, through Chiranjeevi Charitable Trust. Started initially in Anantapur and Guntur districts of Andhra Pradesh, they were later launched various other regions in India, including Telangana. These were launched due to the shortage of oxygen cylinders, ventilators and concentrators, during the second wave of COVID-19 pandemic in India.

Personal life

Ram Charan is married to Upasana Kamineni, the vice-chairman of Apollo Charity and Chief Editor of B Positive magazine. Kamineni is the daughter of Shobana Kamineni and the granddaughter of Prathap C. Reddy, the Executive Chairman of the Apollo Hospitals. They were engaged in December 2011, and subsequently married on 14 June 2012 at the Temple Trees Farm House in Hyderabad. According to an article published by the NewsX, both Charan and Kamineni were friends until ninth grade in the same school at Chennai, Tamil Nadu. On 12th December, 2022 he announced on his instagram that the couple is expecting their first child together.

Religious beliefs 
Ram Charan takes part in the 41-days-long Ayyappa Deeksha (Vratham), which is done on a yearly basis in Sabarimala, Kerala. He started this practice since 2008. Charan stated that "this spiritual living is like a detox holiday for him to de-stress, take healthy and simple food and maintaining inner peace from his chaotic shooting schedules and uncertain mundane things" and said that his father Chiranjeevi had inspired him in following the deeksha.

In the media 
Charan was featured in GQ India's Best Dressed Men list in 2016. He is popularly referred as the "Mega Power Star" in the media. The title is the combination of "Mega Star" [of his father Chiranjeevi] and "Power Star" [of his Uncle Pawan Kalyan]. He has appeared in Forbes India's Celebrity 100 list since 2013. He was ranked twelfth on the Times' 50 Most Desirable Men for the year 2012, twenty-third in 2013, thirtieth in 2014, thirty-eighth in 2015. After a break of three years, he was again featured on the list in 2019 at eighteenth position.

At an event held in January 2016 in Hyderabad, novelist Yandamuri Veerendranath commented that "Charan is surviving on his father Chiranjeevi's popularity". Upon the release of Japanese dubbed version of Magadheera in Japan, Charan received wide popularity in the region. Japanese food company Ezaki Glico printed Charan's photo on their biscuit packets. Belonging to a film family, he admitted that "No two people are born with the same calibre and can achieve the same stardom", regarding nepotism in the film industry. In July 2022, Raveena Tandon said that "Yash, Prabhas and Ram Charan are now pan-Indian names".

Filmography, awards and nominations

References

External links

 
 

21st-century Indian male actors
Filmfare Awards South winners
Film producers from Hyderabad, India
Living people
Male actors in Hindi cinema
Indian male film actors
Telugu male actors
1985 births
Nandi Award winners
Male actors from Hyderabad, India
Telugu film producers
Male actors in Telugu cinema
South Indian International Movie Awards winners
CineMAA Awards winners
Zee Cine Awards Telugu winners
Male actors from Andhra Pradesh
Indian male actors
Santosham Film Awards winners